Jan Carel Zadoks (born 6 February 1929) is a Dutch botanist and a professor emeritus of ecological plant pathology at Wageningen University & Research.

Career 
Zadoks studied biology at the University of Amsterdam  and received his PhD. cum laude from the same university in 1961 for his thesis Yellow rust on wheat, studies in epidemiology and physiologic specialization.

In 1961 Zadoks joined the National Agricultural College, where he was appointed Professor of Ecological Plant Pathology in 1969. He served in various administrative roles, including Dean of the School of Agriculture, and President of the Biology Section (BION) of the Dutch Research Council (Dutch: Nederlandse Organisatie voor Wetenschappelijk Onderzoek, NWO). He was a member of the Committee on Genetic Modification (COGEM) of the Netherlands ('GMO Release Committee'), chairing the Subcommittee on Plants for five years. He was a member of the Netherlands Pesticides Registration Board for 3 years.

Zadoks developed what is arguably the world's first course on plant disease epidemiology with a wet lab and field practical. He pioneered courses in 'Aerobiology', 'Crop Loss', 'Genetics of Resistance' and 'Plant Protection and Society'. The first course formed the basis of the textbook 'Epidemiology and plant disease management'.

Zadoks retired in 1994.

Research on cereal rust epidemiology 
His early research focused on wheat yellow stripe rust and other fungal plant diseases. His 1974 scale to record growth stages of cereals (the 'Zadoks scale') became the internationally recognized standard as used by the Food and Agriculture Organization of the United Nations (FAO) and the International Union for the Protection of New Varieties of Plants (UPOV). He developed dynamic simulation models of plant disease epidemics, and initiated the computerized pest and disease warning system EPIPRE for wheat. Later, he became involved in various studies of focus formation in plant disease, and in alternative agriculture. Once retired, he published on the history of plant pathology.

International agricultural outreach 
In 1969, Zadoks founded the European and Mediterranean Cereal Rust Foundation. He performed consultancy and evaluation missions for the United Nations Food and Agriculture Organization (FAO), CGIAR (Consultative Group for International Agriculture) and for Dutch, French and Swiss governmental institutions with a focus on crop loss, resistance, integrated pest management (IPM) and education. For 14 years he was a member of the FAO Panel of Experts for Integrated Pest Control. He organised the XIII International Plant Protection Congress (IPPC) of the International Association for the Plant Protection Sciences at The Hague in 1995.

Collection of Sinterklaas wrapping papers 
In addition to his academic work in plant pathology, Zadoks collected 1500 items of Sinterklaas-themed wrapping paper over a period of 50 years, and wrote about the themes and changes in their design in his publication Sinterklaas verpakt - Vijftig jaar Sint Nicolaas inwikkelpapier (translates as: "Sinterklaas wrapped - Fifty years of Sinterklaas wrapping paper"). One of Zadoks' conclusions is that the portrayal of Sinterklaas' blackface companion, Zwarte Piet, has undergone significant metamorphoses from 1960-2010.

Awards and honours

Publications

Scientific works 
 1979 - Epidemiology and plant disease management - with R.D. Schein
 2005 - Sea lavender, rust and mildew. A perennial pathosystem in the Netherlands
 2008 - On the political economy of plant disease epidemics. Capita selecta in historical epidemiology
 2013 - Crop protection in medieval agriculture. Studies in pre-modern organic agriculture
 2014 - Black shank of tobacco in the former Dutch East Indies, caused by Phytophthora nicotianae

Other works 
 
  This book is a translation of On Civility in Children (French: La civilité puerile et honneste pour l’instruction des enfans; Latin: De civilitate morum puerilium) by Erasmus, translated by Zadoks, with an introduction by Zadoks.

Literature

External link

References 

1929 births
Dutch botanists
Living people
Scientists from Amsterdam
University of Amsterdam alumni
Academic staff of Wageningen University and Research